Minam National Forest was first established in Oregon on July 1, 1911 with  from part of Wallowa National Forest.  On June 20, 1920 it was transferred Whitman National Forest and the name was discontinued. Its lands exist now as part of Wallowa–Whitman National Forest

References

External links
Forest History Society
Forest History Society:Listing of the National Forests of the United States Text from Davis, Richard C., ed. Encyclopedia of American Forest and Conservation History. New York: Macmillan Publishing Company for the Forest History Society, 1983. Vol. II, pp. 743-788.

Former National Forests of Oregon
1911 establishments in Oregon
Protected areas established in 1911
1920 disestablishments in Oregon